Kurumbhur, also named as Kurambur or Kurumbur, a village located at Cheyyar taluk, Thiruvannamalai district of Tamil Nadu|

Location
Kurumbhur is located on just near of State Highway 116 Road between Kancheepuram and Vandavasi, it connected by Melmaa Koot (Cross) Road and is served by buses from both cities. It lies 106 kilometres South-West of  Chennai. City, 30 km south of famous temple city Kanchipuram and 92 km north-east of Thiruvannamalai. The village is well connected with Chennai by road. It is one of 219 villages in Cheyyar Block along with Thethurai, Narmapallam, and others.

Geography and climate
Kurumbhur is located at 12.58°N 79.62°E. It has an average elevation of  mean sea level (MSL). This village Having a beautiful lake, Kurumbhur climatic condition is similar to that of Chennai, lying on the thermal equator and close to the coast, most part of the year climate is hot and humid. It belongs to North-East Monsoon and gets some of rain from South-West Monsoon, the best time to visit Kurumbhur is September to February.

Demographics

Tamil is the local language here.

Politics
 elections, a new candidate K.S. Gopalakrishnan Naaidu won by 151 votes, after a long period a young person leads this village.

Transportation

Air
 The Chennai International Airport is the nearest airport which is 88 km, the road route of Kurumbhur-Manampathi-Uthiramerur-Bukkathurai-Chengelpattu-Tambaram leads to the airport.
 Tirupati Airport                  124 km     
 Salem Airport                     208 km     
 Bengaluru International Airport   234 km

Train
 The Kanchipuram railway station in Kanchipuram is most easily accessible by road of 30 km.
 Nathapettai Railway Station   33 km     
 Walajabad   Railway Station   38 km  
 Arni Road   Railway Station   41 km

Bus
 Plenty of buses ply along "Melmaa Koot (Cross) Road". There are direct buses to Chennai, Villupuram, Tirupathi, Thiruthani, Tiruvannamalai, Pondicherry, Arakkonam, Trichy, Mannargudi, and Tanjavur.

Nearby touristic places

 Thennaangur Pandurangan Temple-      5 km
 Koozhamandhal Pesum Perumal Temple- 12 km
 Vandavasi Hill Temple-               8 km
 Vandavasi Old Fort-                 13 km
 Kattukudisai Forest-                 6 km
 Thiruthani murugar temple-          75 km
 Vellore fort-                       80 km
 Vedanthangal Bird Sanctuary-        36 km
 Thirukazhukundram Perumal Temple-   61 km

References

https://www.google.co.in/search?hl=en&q=12.581539,79.620445&ie=UTF-8&gl=in&sa=N&tab=lw#gl=in&hl=en&q=12.581539+north+79.620445+east

External links
 http://wikiedit.org/India/Kurumbur/234081/
 http://www.indiagrowing.com/Tamil_Nadu/Tiruvannamalai/Cheyyar/Kurumbur
 http://villagesinindia.in/tamil_nadu/tiruvannamalai/cheyyar/kurumbur.html

Villages in Tiruvannamalai district